Marco da Silva Ignácio (born 15 June 1989), commonly known as Marquinho, is a Brazilian footballer. Mainly an attacking midfielder, he can also play as a wing back.

Club career
Born in Vassouras, Rio de Janeiro, Marquinhos graduated with Paulista's youth setup, and made his senior debuts while on loan at Votoraty in 2009. He returned to the former in 2010, and appeared with the side in Campeonato Paulista.

On 30 August 2011 Marquinhos moved to Vila Nova, until the end of the year. He made his debut for the club on 2 September, starting in a 1–1 away draw against Ponte Preta for the Série B championship.

After appearing rarely, Marquinhos joined Atlético Sorocaba on 7 December 2011. On 25 June 2013 he signed for Audax, after featuring regularly with his previous team.

Marquinhos also represented Guaratinguetá in 2014, on loan, after a partnership with Audax was agreed. In 2015, he returned to his parent club, being an undisputed starter during that year's Paulistão.

On 15 May 2015 Marquinhos signed for Santos, on loan until the end of the year. He made his debut for the club on 3 June, coming on as a second-half substitute for Geuvânio in a 2–3 Série A away loss against São Paulo.

On 2 June 2016, Marquinhos renewed with Peixe until 2017 and was immediately loaned to Oeste.

On 28 December 2017 Marquinhos signed for São Bento.

Career statistics

Honours
Paulista
Copa Paulista: 2010

References

External links

1989 births
Living people
Sportspeople from Rio de Janeiro (state)
Brazilian footballers
Association football midfielders
Campeonato Brasileiro Série A players
Campeonato Brasileiro Série B players
Campeonato Brasileiro Série C players
Campeonato Brasileiro Série D players
Paulista Futebol Clube players
Vila Nova Futebol Clube players
Clube Atlético Sorocaba players
Grêmio Osasco Audax Esporte Clube players
Guaratinguetá Futebol players
Santos FC players
Oeste Futebol Clube players
Esporte Clube São Bento players
Botafogo Futebol Clube (SP) players
Mirassol Futebol Clube players
Ituano FC players
Sport Club do Recife players
Esporte Clube Água Santa players
São Bernardo Futebol Clube players
People from Vassouras